Edward George Christopher Young (born 1989) is an English cricketer, a right-handed batsman and slow left-arm orthodox bowler who last played for Gloucestershire. He made his first-class debut for Oxford UCCE against Worcestershire in April 2009. Young signed a two-year development contract with Gloucestershire in August 2010 whilst also studying at Oxford Brookes University. Young's older brother, Peter was also a cricketer and also played nine first-class games for Oxford UCCE.

County career
Born 21 May 1989, Chertsey, Surrey, England, Young made his debut for Oxford UCCE in a 3-day match against Worcestershire. The game was affected by rain with no play on day one. Due to the weather Young bowled only 3 overs for 22 runs and was 0 not out from one ball in a drawn match. Young made his highest first-class score of 133 runs from 179 balls against Lancashire in April 2011. In April 2011 Young scored 80 runs from 111 balls for Oxford against Nottinghamshire in a drawn match, he also took one wicket in the match that of Andy Carter. In late May 2011, Young played for Gloucestershire in a first-class match against Essex. He scored 51 not out in 126 balls in a drawn match at Bristol. In June 2011, Young took 2 wickets for 32 runs in his 4 overs in a Twenty20 loss against Essex. Young also starred with the ball in a Twenty20 match against Hampshire in June 2011. He conceded only 14 runs and took 2 wickets in his maximum 4 overs in a 9 run loss.

In the winter of 2011, Young was part of Darren Lehmann's cricket academy in Adelaide. He returned from this experience to take a more active part in the County Championship during the 2012 season.

Young played in just one County Championship game in 2013 and was consequently released by Gloucestershire on 8 October 2013.

Career best performances
as of 1 October 2013

References

External links
 
 Ed Young Gloucestershire profile

Living people
English cricketers
Oxford MCCU cricketers
Unicorns cricketers
Gloucestershire cricketers
1989 births
Sportspeople from Chertsey
Wiltshire cricketers
Marylebone Cricket Club cricketers